The Ontario Institute for Cancer Research (OICR) is a not-for-profit organization based in Toronto, Ontario, Canada that focuses on the prevention, early detection, diagnosis and treatment of cancer. OICR intends to make Ontario more effective in knowledge transfer and commercialization while maximizing the health and economic benefits of research findings for the people of Ontario. OICR was launched in 2005 by the Government of Ontario, which provides funding through the Ministry of Colleges and Universities. The Institute employs more than 300 people at its research hub at the MaRS Centre in downtown Toronto and funds more than 1,900 scientific staff at hospital-based research institutes and universities around the province. In 2018 it was the highest funder of cancer research in Canada.

History

Ontario Cancer Research Network

OICR’s predecessor organization was the Ontario Cancer Research Network (OCRN), a not-for-profit corporation established by the Government of Ontario in November 2001 to increase translational research related to the development of new cancer therapies. OCRN’s four main program areas were: the Ontario Tumour Bank, Clinical Trials Programs, the Ontario Cancer Research Ethics Board and the Cancer Research Fund. The organization was headed by Robert A. Phillips.

Ontario Institute for Cancer Research

In May 2005 the Government of Ontario announced its intent to launch a new cancer research institute in the province. OCRN was asked to evolve into the new institute, which would later be named OICR. OICR was formally launched by Ontario Premier Dalton McGuinty in December 2005. OICR was designed to continue OCRN’s translational research programs while building new research capacity in the province. Thomas J. Hudson was appointed President and Scientific Director of OICR in June 2006 and Robert A. Phillips was appointed Deputy Director. Hudson consulted with the Ontario cancer research community and external experts to develop a strategic research plan for the Institute in 2006. In February 2007 the completed strategic plan was approved by the Ministry of Research and Innovation.

Facilities 

OICR occupies labs and office space in the MaRS Centre in downtown Toronto, Ontario, Canada. Located in the heart of Toronto’s Discovery District, the MaRS Centre’s neighbours include the University of Toronto, the Provincial Legislature, University Health Network (including Princess Margaret Cancer Centre, Toronto General Hospital and the Ontario Cancer Institute), The Hospital for Sick Children and Mount Sinai Hospital. It is also located just north of Toronto’s financial district. OICR funds research in other affiliated labs and institutions located in Hamilton, Kingston, London, Ottawa, Sudbury, Thunder Bay, Toronto and Waterloo.

The lab space in the building was designed and constructed by NXL and completed in 2008. The total space of the area is 58,000 sf. OICR is using the floors 5,6 and 8. An extension of the office and lab space in the MaRS Centre was designed by Diamond and Schmitt Architects in 2012. The lobby and entrance is on the 5th floor, with a lobby, lounge and a helical staircase connecting offices and the lounge on both the 5th and the 6th floor.

References 

Research institutes in Canada
Cancer organizations based in Canada